Storrs is a hamlet in the South Lakeland district of Cumbria, England.

Historically a part of Westmorland, the most notable landmark is the Grade II* listed Georgian mansion and folly at Storrs Hall.

See also

Listed buildings in Windermere, Cumbria (town)

References

External links

Hamlets in Cumbria
South Lakeland District